The Vermio Mountains, known in antiquity as the Bermion, is a mountain range in northern Greece. It lies between the Imathia Regional Unit of the Central Macedonia Region and the Kozani Regional Unit of the Western Macedonia Region. The range is west of the plain of Kambania. The town of Veria, which is the capital of Imathia, is built on the foot of these mountains. The highest point in the range is the peak Chamiti,  elevation, west of Naousa. In Turkish the mountain is known as Karatash (Karataş), and in Bulgarian it is known as Karakamen (Каракамен).

The Vermio Mountains are the site of ski resorts such as Seli and Tria Pente Pigadia.

It was mentioned in antiquity by Pliny, Strabo, Stephen of Byzantium, Hierocles, Ptolemy, and Thucydides and Herodotus. In classical times the mountain was thought by Herodotus to be impassible and according to tradition, paradise was to be held on the other side. During Hellenistic times was an internal boundary of the Macedonian state.

Gallery

References

External links
  Greek Mountain Flora
  Encyclopædia Britannica entry (subscription required)
 Vermio terrain map by Geopsis

Landforms of Imathia
Mountain ranges of Greece
Landforms of Central Macedonia
Landforms of Western Macedonia
Ski areas and resorts in Greece